= Amminbhavi =

- Village
- Location in Karnataka, India Amminbhavi (India)
- Coordinates: 16.306259°N 74.541828°E
- Country: India
- State: Karnataka
- District: Belgaum
- Talukas: Hukkeri

Population (2001)
  - Total: 2,000

Languages
  - Official: Kannada
- Time zone: UTC+5:30 (IST)
- PIN: 591236
- Nearest city: Belgaum
- Sex ratio: female 50% and male 50% ♂/♀
- Literacy: 55%%

Amminbhavi is a village in Belgaum district in the southern state of Karnataka, India. It is one of the villages in the Belgaum district.

== Demographics ==
Since 2000 the literacy rate is increasing. It was 15% in 1985, 20% in 1990, 25% in 1995, 30% in 2000, 40% in 2005, and now (2011) it has reached 58%. The total population of Amminabhavi consists of 90% Hindu and 10% Muslim.
